Judson Donald Buechler (born June 19, 1968) is an American professional basketball coach and former player who is an assistant coach for the New York Knicks of the National Basketball Association (NBA). He was part of the Chicago Bulls during their three consecutive championship seasons between 1996 and 1998.

Early life and college career
Buechler grew up in Poway, California, and attended Poway High School, where he was a top basketball recruit as well as a Top-50 men's volleyball prospect. He was a basketball player for all four seasons, and an All-American volleyball player at the University of Arizona, where he earned the nickname "The Judge". As a basketball player, his career averages with Arizona were 8.7 points, 4.9 rebounds, and 1.9 assists over 22.4 minutes per game across 131 games.

NBA career
A sharp-shooting 6 ft 6 in guard/forward, Buechler was selected by the Seattle SuperSonics in the 2nd round, 38th overall, of the 1990 NBA draft. His draft rights were immediately traded to the New Jersey Nets, and he spent slightly over one season with the Nets before being waived in 1991.

After a brief stint with the San Antonio Spurs, he signed with the Golden State Warriors, with whom he averaged 6.2 points, 1.3 assists and 2.8 rebounds (all career highs) during the 1992–93 NBA season. However, Buechler would become best known for his four-year tenure (1994–1998) with the Chicago Bulls. With his former college teammate Steve Kerr, Buechler provided clutch shooting off the bench during the Bulls' second three-peat (1996–1998).

As the Bulls began their post-Jordan rebuilding process in 1999, Buechler signed with the Detroit Pistons, where he played for three seasons before being traded to the Phoenix Suns.

Buechler ended his career in 2002 after a short stint with the Orlando Magic. Buechler played 720 games across 12 seasons, with seven different franchises.

NBA career statistics

Regular season 

|-
|style="text-align:left;"|
|style="text-align:left;"|New Jersey
|74|| 10||11.6||.416||.250||.652||1.9||.7||.4||.2||3.1
|-
|style="text-align:left;|
|style="text-align:left;"|New Jersey
|2||0||14.5||.500||–||–||1.0||1.0||1.0||.5||4.0
|-
|style="text-align:left;"|
|style="text-align:left;"|San Antonio
|11||0||12.7||.500||–||.333||2.0||1.0||.7||.3||3.0
|-
|style="text-align:left;"|
|style="text-align:left;"|Golden State
|15||0||8.1||.303||.000||.750||1.9||.7||.6||.2||1.9
|-
|style="text-align:left;"|
|style="text-align:left;"|Golden State
|70||9||18.4||.437||.339||.747||2.8||1.3||.7||.3||6.2
|-
|style="text-align:left;"|
|style="text-align:left;"|Golden State
|36||0||6.1||.500||.414||.500||.9||.4||.2||.0||2.9
|-
|style="text-align:left;"|
|style="text-align:left;"|Chicago
|57||0||10.6||.492||.313||.564||1.7||.9||.4||.2||3.8
|-
|style="text-align:left;background:#afe6ba;"|†
|style="text-align:left;"|Chicago
|74||0||10.0||.463||.444||.636||1.5||.8||.5||.1||3.8
|-
|style="text-align:left;background:#afe6ba;"|†
|style="text-align:left;"|Chicago
|76||0||9.3||.367||.333||.357||1.7||.8||.3||.3||1.8
|-
|style="text-align:left;background:#afe6ba;"|†
|style="text-align:left;"|Chicago
|74||0||8.2||.483||.385||.500||1.0||.7||.3||.2||2.7
|-
|style="text-align:left;"|
|style="text-align:left;"|Detroit
|style="background:#cfecec;"|50*||0||21.1||.417||.412||.722||2.7||1.1||.7||.3||5.5
|-
|style="text-align:left;"|
|style="text-align:left;"|Detroit
|58||5||11.3||.353||.217||.286||1.6||.6||.4||.3||2.2
|-
|style="text-align:left;"|
|style="text-align:left;"|Detroit
|57||3||12.9||.463||.416||.750||1.6||.7||.4||.2||3.4
|-
|style="text-align:left;"|
|style="text-align:left;"|Phoenix
|6||0||9.0||.333||.333||–||1.3||.5||.2||.0||1.0
|-
|style="text-align:left;"|
|style="text-align:left;"|Orlando
|60||2||10.5||.375||.352||.500||1.8||.5||.3||.1||1.8
|- class="sortbottom"
|style="text-align:center;" colspan=2|Career
|720||29||11.7||.433||.366||.633||1.8||.8||.4||.2||3.3
|}

Playoffs 

|-
|style="text-align:left;"|1995
|style="text-align:left;"|Chicago
|10||0||10.4||.429||.000||.500||2.0||.5||.4||.3||2.0
|-
|style="text-align:left;background:#afe6ba;"|1996†
|style="text-align:left;"|Chicago
|17||0||7.5||.474||.381||.500||.6||.4||.4||.0||2.7
|-
|style="text-align:left;background:#afe6ba;"|1997†
|style="text-align:left;"|Chicago
|18||0||7.7||.419||.333||.600||1.3||.3||.2||.1||1.8
|-
|style="text-align:left;background:#afe6ba;"|1998†
|style="text-align:left;"|Chicago
|16||0||4.0||.364||.600||–||.7||.2||.2||.1||.7
|-
|style="text-align:left;"|1999
|style="text-align:left;"|Detroit
|5||0||16.8||.200||.250||–||2.6||.6||.6||.2||1.6
|-
|style="text-align:left;"|2000
|style="text-align:left;"|Detroit
|3||0||11.3||.286||.400||–||1.3||.3||.0||.3||2.0
|-
|style="text-align:left;"|2002
|style="text-align:left;"|Orlando
|2||0||5.0||–||–||–||.5||.5||.5||.0||.0
|- class="sortbottom"
|style="text-align:center;" colspan=2|Career
|71||0||7.9||.398||.358||.538||1.2||.3||.3||.1||1.7
|}

References

External links

1968 births
Living people
American men's basketball players
Arizona Wildcats men's basketball players
Basketball coaches from California
Basketball players from San Diego
Chicago Bulls players
Detroit Pistons players
Golden State Warriors players
Los Angeles Lakers assistant coaches
New Jersey Nets players
New York Knicks assistant coaches
Orlando Magic players
Phoenix Suns players
San Antonio Spurs players
Seattle SuperSonics draft picks
Shooting guards
Small forwards